Nordland is one of the 19 multi-member constituencies of the Storting, the national legislature of Norway. The constituency was established in 1921 following the introduction of proportional representation for elections to the Storting. It is conterminous with the county of Nordland. The constituency currently elects eight of the 169 members of the Storting using the open party-list proportional representation electoral system. At the 2021 parliamentary election it had 182,075 registered electors.

Electoral system
Nordland currently elects eight of the 169 members of the Storting using the open party-list proportional representation electoral system. Constituency seats are allocated by the County Electoral Committee using the Modified Sainte-Laguë method. Compensatory seats (seats at large) are calculated based on the national vote and are allocated by the National Electoral Committee using the Modified Sainte-Laguë method at the constituency level (one for each constituency). Only parties that reach the 4% national threshold compete for compensatory seats.

Election results

Summary

(Excludes compensatory seats. Figures in italics represent joint lists.)

Detailed

2020s

2021
Results of the 2021 parliamentary election held on 13 September 2021:

The following candidates were elected:
Mona Fagerås (SV); Geir-Asbjørn Jørgensen (R); Øystein Mathisen (Ap); Siv Mossleth (Sp); Mona Nilsen (Ap); Willfred Nordlund (Sp); Dagfinn Henrik Olsen (FrP); Bjørnar Skjæran (Ap); and Bård Ludvig Thorheim (H).

2010s

2017
Results of the 2017 parliamentary election held on 11 September 2017:

The following candidates were elected:
Margunn Ebbesen (H); Mona Fagerås (SV); Jonny Finstad (H); Kjell-Børge Freiberg (FrP); Åsunn Lyngedal (Ap); Siv Mossleth (Sp); Willfred Nordlund (Sp); Eirik Sivertsen (Ap); and Hanne Dyveke Søttar (FrP).

2013
Results of the 2013 parliamentary election held on 8 and 9 September 2013:

The following candidates were elected:
Lisbeth Berg-Hansen (Ap); Margunn Ebbesen (H); Jan Arild Ellingsen (FrP); Odd Henriksen (H); Kjell-Idar Juvik (Ap); Anna Ljunggren (Ap); Janne Sjelmo Nordås (Sp); Eirik Sivertsen (Ap); and Kenneth Svendsen (FrP).

2000s

2009
Results of the 2009 parliamentary election held on 13 and 14 September 2009:

The following candidates were elected:
Jan Arild Ellingsen (FrP); Geir-Ketil Hansen (SV); Lillian Hansen (Ap); Ivar Kristiansen (H); Anna Ljunggren (Ap); Janne Sjelmo Nordås (Sp); Eirik Sivertsen (Ap); Tor-Arne Strøm (Ap); Kenneth Svendsen (FrP); and Torgeir Trældal (FrP).

2005
Results of the 2005 parliamentary election held on 11 and 12 September 2005:

The following candidates were elected:
Jan Arild Ellingsen (FrP); Åsa Elvik (SV); Ivar Kristiansen (H); Anna Ljunggren (Ap); Torny Pedersen (Ap); Jan Sahl (KrF); Alf Ivar Samuelsen (Sp); Hill-Marta Solberg (Ap); Tor-Arne Strøm (Ap); and Kenneth Svendsen (FrP).

2001
Results of the 2001 parliamentary election held on 9 and 10 September 2001:

The following candidates were elected:
Steinar Bastesen (KP); Jan Arild Ellingsen (FrP); Åsa Elvik (SV); Odd Roger Enoksen (Sp); Geir-Ketil Hansen (SV); Ivar Kristiansen (H); Torny Pedersen (Ap); Jan Sahl (KrF); Hill-Marta Solberg (Ap); Tor-Arne Strøm (Ap); Kenneth Svendsen (FrP); and Søren Fredrik Voie (H).

1990s

1997
Results of the 1997 parliamentary election held on 15 September 1997:

The following candidates were elected:
Steinar Bastesen (TVF); Gunnar Breimo (Ap); Odd Roger Enoksen (Sp); Odd Eriksen (Ap); Ivar Kristiansen (H); Inge Myrvoll (SV); Tomas Norvoll (Ap): Kari Økland (KrF); Torny Pedersen (Ap); Jan Sahl (KrF); Hill-Marta Solberg (Ap); and Kenneth Svendsen (FrP).

1993
Results of the 1993 parliamentary election held on 12 and 13 September 1993:

The following candidates were elected:
Peter Angelsen (Sp); Gunnar Breimo (Ap); Odd Roger Enoksen (Sp); Odd Eriksen (Ap); Dag Jostein Fjærvoll (KrF); Lisbeth Holand (SV); Ragna Berget Jørgensen (Ap); Inga Kvalbukt (Sp); Inge Myrvoll (SV); Tomas Norvoll (Ap): Hill-Marta Solberg (Ap); and Petter Thomassen (H).

1980s

1989
Results of the 1989 parliamentary election held on 10 and 11 September 1989:

The following candidates were elected:
Peter Angelsen (Sp); Rolf Bendiksen (Ap); Dag Jostein Fjærvoll (KrF); Åshild Hauan (Ap); Lisbeth Holand (SV); Harry Jensen (FrP); Ragna Berget Jørgensen (Ap); Thea Knutzen (H); Bjarne Mørk Eidem (Ap); Inge Myrvoll (SV); Inger Pedersen (Ap); and Petter Thomassen (H).

1985
Results of the 1985 parliamentary election held on 8 and 9 September 1985:

The following candidates were elected:
Peter Angelsen (Sp); Dag Jostein Fjærvoll (KrF); Åshild Hauan (Ap); Jan-Olav Ingvaldsen (Ap); Ragna Berget Jørgensen (Ap); Finn Knutsen (Ap); Thea Knutzen (H); Hanna Kvanmo (SV); Bjarne Mørk Eidem (Ap); Inger Pedersen (Ap); Hans Svendsgård (H); and Petter Thomassen (H).

1981
Results of the 1981 parliamentary election held on 13 and 14 September 1981:

The following candidates were elected:
Peter Angelsen (Sp); Eivind Bolle (Ap); Harry Danielsen (H); Åshild Hauan (Ap); Karl Ingebrigtsen (Ap); Ragna Berget Jørgensen (Ap); Elsa Kobberstad (H); Hanna Kvanmo (SV); Bjarne Mørk Eidem (Ap); Hans Svendsgård (H); Petter Thomassen (H); and Odd With (KrF).

1970s

1977
Results of the 1977 parliamentary election held on 11 and 12 September 1977:

The following candidates were elected:
Eivind Bolle (Ap); Gudmund Grytøyr (Ap); Rolf Hellem (Ap); Per Karstensen (Ap); Karl Sverre Klevstad (KrF); Hanna Kvanmo (SV); Håkon Kyllingmark (H); Bjarne Mørk Eidem (Ap); Kåre Rønning (Sp); Anne-Lise Steinbach (Ap); Petter Thomassen (H); and Odd With (KrF).

1973
Results of the 1973 parliamentary election held on 9 and 10 September 1973:

The following candidates were elected:
Eivind Bolle (Ap); Odin Hansen (SV); Rolf Hellem (Ap); Per Karstensen (Ap); Karl Sverre Klevstad (KrF); Hanna Kvanmo (SV); Håkon Kyllingmark (H); Bjarne Mørk Eidem (Ap); Kåre Rønning (Sp); Anne-Lise Steinbach (Ap); Odd With (KrF); and Willy Arne Wold (Sp).

1960s

1969
Results of the 1969 parliamentary election held on 7 and 8 September 1969:

The following candidates were elected:
Bodil Aakre (H); Magnus Andersen (Ap); Erling Engan (Sp); Edmund Fjærvoll (KrF); Rolf Hellem (Ap); Per Karstensen (Ap); Johan Kleppe (V); Håkon Kyllingmark (H); Bjarne Mørk Eidem (Ap); Margith Johanne Munkebye (Ap); Walter Kåre Tjønndal (Ap); and Willy Arne Wold (Sp).

1965
Results of the 1965 parliamentary election held on 12 and 13 September 1965:

The following candidates were elected:
Magnus Andersen (Ap); Hans Berg (KrF); Halvor Bjellaanes (V); Erling Engan (Sp); Jonas Enge (Ap); Sigurd Lund Hamran (Ap); Rolf Hellem (Ap); Asbjørn Holm (SF); Per Karstensen (Ap); Håkon Kyllingmark (H); Margith Johanne Munkebye (Ap); and Harald Warholm (H).

1961
Results of the 1961 parliamentary election held on 11 September 1961:

The following candidates were elected:
Hans Berg (KrF), 11,646 votes; Parelius Hjalmar Bang Berntsen (Ap), 49,670 votes; Erling Engan (Sp), 10,315 votes; Jonas Enge (Ap), 49,667 votes; Edmund Fjærvoll (KrF), 11,657 votes; Sigurd Lund Hamran (Ap), 49,666 votes; Asbjørn Holm (SF), 7,117 votes; Håkon Kyllingmark (H), 14,899 votes; Margith Johanne Munkebye (Ap), 49,664 votes; Petter Carl Reinsnes (Ap), 49,671 votes; Kolbjørn Varmann (Ap), 49,671 votes; and Harald Warholm (H), 14,893 votes.

1950s

1957
Results of the 1957 parliamentary election held on 7 October 1957:

The following candidates were elected:
Hans Berg (KrF); Parelius Hjalmar Bang Berntsen (Ap); Reidar Carlsen (Ap); Erling Engan (Bp); Jonas Enge (Ap); Sigurd Lund Hamran (Ap); Håkon Kyllingmark (H); Margith Johanne Munkebye (Ap); Petter Carl Reinsnes (Ap); Kolbjørn Varmann (Ap); Erling Johan Vindenes (V); and Harald Warholm (H).

1953
Results of the 1953 parliamentary election held on 12 October 1953:

The following candidates were elected:
Hans Berg (KrF); Parelius Hjalmar Bang Berntsen (Ap); Reidar Carlsen (Ap); Erling Engan (Bp); Jonas Enge (Ap); Sigurd Lund Hamran (Ap);Håkon Kyllingmark (H); Alfred Sigurd Nilsen (Ap); Lauritz Johan Riise (H); Jens Olai Steffensen (Ap); Kolbjørn Varmann (Ap); and Erling Johan Vindenes (V).

1940s

1949
Results of the 1949 parliamentary election held on 10 October 1949:

The following candidates were elected:
Parelius Hjalmar Bang Berntsen (Ap); Reidar Carlsen (Ap); Jonas Enge (Ap); Kristoffer Skåne Grytnes (KrF); Arnold Carl Johansen (BS); Jens Olai Steffensen (Ap); Kolbjørn Varmann (Ap); and Erling Johan Vindenes (V).

1945
Results of the 1945 parliamentary election held on 8 October 1945:

As the list alliance was entitled to more seats contesting as an alliance than it was contesting as individual parties, the distribution of seats was as list alliance votes. The BS-Bp list alliance's additional seat was allocated to the Civic Assembly Party.

The following candidates were elected:
Parelius Hjalmar Bang Berntsen (Ap); Reidar Carlsen (Ap); Anton Djupvik (V); Hårek Ludvig Hansen (BS); Kristian Moljord (K); Jens Olai Steffensen (Ap); Cato Andreas Sverdrup (BS); and Haakon Olsen Wika (Ap).

1930s

1936
Results of the 1936 parliamentary election held on 19 October 1936:

As the list alliance was entitled to more seats contesting as an alliance than it was contesting as individual parties, the distribution of seats was as list alliance votes. The BS-Bp-FF-Fl list alliance's additional seat was allocated to the Civic Assembly Party.

The following candidates were elected:
Johan Jæger Caroliussen (V); Sigurd H. Jacobsen (Samfp); Arnt Ove Krane (BS); Nils Mjaavatn (Bp); Andreas Moan (Ap); Jens Olai Steffensen (Ap); Cato Andreas Sverdrup (BS); and Haakon Olsen Wika (Ap).

1933
Results of the 1933 parliamentary election held on 16 October 1933:

As the list alliance was not entitled to more seats contesting as an alliance than it was contesting as individual parties, the distribution of seats was as party votes.

The following candidates were elected:
Carl Bonnevie (Ap); Johan Jæger Caroliussen (V); Cornelius Lind Enge (Ap); Haavard Nikolai Hanssen (Bp); Nils Mjaavatn (Bp); Andreas Moan (Ap); Eilert Hagerup Prytz Pedersen Præsteng (BS); and Jens Olai Steffensen (Ap).

1930
Results of the 1930 parliamentary election held on 20 October 1930:

As the list alliance was not entitled to more seats contesting as an alliance than it was contesting as individual parties, the distribution of seats was as party votes.

The following candidates were elected:
Johan Jæger Caroliussen (V); Anton Djupvik (V); Cornelius Lind Enge (Ap); Arnt Gurnerius Holm (FV); Andreas Angel Hansen Holdø (BS); Nils Mjaavatn (Bp); Andreas Moan (Ap); and Eilert Hagerup Prytz Pedersen Præsteng (BS).

1920s

1927
Results of the 1927 parliamentary election held on 17 October 1927:

The following candidates were elected:
Johan Jæger Caroliussen (V); Anton Djupvik (V); Cornelius Lind Enge (Ap); Jakob Karsten Olsen Gavlen (Ap); Nils Mjaavatn (Bp); Andreas Moan (Ap); Johan E. Paulsen (BS); and Eilert Hagerup Prytz Pedersen Præsteng (BS).

1924
Results of the 1924 parliamentary election held on 21 October 1924:

The following candidates were elected:
Johan Jæger Caroliussen (V); Anton Djupvik (V); Andreas Angel Hansen Holdø (H-FV); Andreas Moan (Ap); Johan E. Paulsen (H-FV); Eilert Hagerup Prytz Pedersen Præsteng (H-FV); Jens Jørgen Jensen Steiro (Bp); and Ingvald Ytterstad (H-FV).

1921
Results of the 1921 parliamentary election held on 24 October 1921:

The following candidates were elected:
Peter Olsen Bolstad (Ap); Johan Jæger Caroliussen (V); Nils M. Kulstad (V); Andreas Moan (Ap); Sven Martin Nøkleby (H-FV); Eilert Hagerup Prytz Pedersen Præsteng (H-FV); Mathias Johan Rasofill Skaar (H-FV); and Jens Jørgen Jensen Steiro (L).

Notes

References

Storting constituency
Storting constituencies
Storting constituencies established in 1921